

Offseason 
 November 5, 1976: Joe Lis was drafted from the Indians by the Seattle Mariners in the 1976 Major League Baseball expansion draft.
 December 6, 1976: Rick Cerone and John Lowenstein were traded by the Indians to the Toronto Blue Jays for Rico Carty.
 December 10, 1976: Jackie Brown was traded by the Indians to the Montreal Expos for Andre Thornton.
 March 30, 1977: Boog Powell was released by the Indians.

Regular season 
On May 30, Indians pitcher Dennis Eckersley threw a no-hitter against the California Angels.

Season standings

Record vs. opponents

Transactions 
June 7, 1977: Jerry Dybzinski was drafted by the Cleveland Indians in the 15th round of the 1977 amateur draft.
 September 9, 1977: Ray Fosse was traded by the Indians to the Seattle Mariners for Bill Laxton and cash.

Opening Day Lineup

Roster

Player stats

Batting
Note: G = Games played; AB = At bats; R = Runs scored; H = Hits; 2B = Doubles; 3B = Triples; HR = Home runs; RBI = Runs batted in; AVG = Batting average; SB = Stolen bases

Pitching
Note: W = Wins; L = Losses; ERA = Earned run average; G = Games pitched; GS = Games started; SV = Saves; IP = Innings pitched; R = Runs allowed; ER = Earned runs allowed; BB = Walks allowed; K = Strikeouts

Awards and honors 

All-Star Game

Farm system

Notes

References 
1977 Cleveland Indians team at Baseball-Reference
1977 Cleveland Indians team page at www.baseball-almanac.com

Cleveland Guardians seasons
Cleveland Indians season
Cincinnati Indians